Nikolskoye is a rural locality (a selo) and the administrative center of Nikolayevskoye Rural Settlement, Anninsky District, Voronezh Oblast, Russia. The population was 1,019 as of 2010. There are 14 streets.

Geography 
Nikolskoye is located 41 km east of Anna (the district's administrative centre) by road. Ostrovki is the nearest rural locality.

References 

Rural localities in Anninsky District